Leandro Onetto Baccino (born 12 December 1996) is a Uruguayan footballer who plays as a midfielder or winger for Cerro Largo.

Career

Onetto started his career with Uruguayan second division side Progreso, where he made 33 league appearances and scored 4 goals and was nicknamed "Forlán" due to physically resembling Uruguay international Diego Forlán 

Before the 2019 season, Onetto signed for Danubio in the Uruguayan top flight.

In 2020, he signed for Uruguayan second division club Villa Teresa.

References

External links

 
 

Uruguayan footballers
Living people
Danubio F.C. players
1996 births
Uruguayan people of Italian descent
Uruguayan Segunda División players
Uruguayan Primera División players
C.A. Progreso players
People from Fray Bentos
Villa Teresa players
Cerro Largo F.C. players
Association football midfielders
Association football wingers